Baranco is a surname. Notable people with the surname include:

 Juanita Baranco (born 1949), American corporate executive
 Wilbert Baranco (1909–1983), American jazz pianist and bandleader

See also
 Branco (surname)